Altos Design Automation, Inc. was an electronic design automation
software company.   Altos developed and marketed cell and semiconductor
intellectual property (IP) characterization tools that created library views
for timing, signal integrity and power analysis and optimization. The Altos
tools were fully automated and the company claimed that its tools are
extremely fast.   The Altos tools were used by engineers employing both
corner-based and statistical-based design implementation flows to reduce
time-to -market and improve yield.

Altos was founded in January 2005 in Santa Clara,
California by former employees of Cadence Design Systems. All members of the
team worked at CadMOS where they were responsible for the development of
Signal Integrity analysis tools for both cell- and transistor-level digital
IC designers. In May 2011 Altos was acquired by Cadence.

Products

Variety creates statistical timing cell models that represent the non-linear impact of any number of systematic and random parameter variations.  All library timing data is characterized for variation including delays, transitions, timing constraints, and pin capacitances. Variety generates statistical static timing analysis (SSTA) models for a number of commercial SSTA products from a single characterization run.

Liberate is an automated library characterization tool for standard cells and I/Os that serves existing static timing analyzers. Liberate takes in a Spice netlist and Spice subcircuits, and automatically generates a characterized cell library. It supports both Composite Current Source (CCS) model backed by Synopsys and the Effective Current Source Model (ECSM) backed by Cadence Design Systems.

Footnotes

References
 "Fireside Chat: Rick Lucier and Jim McCanny", EDACafe, 2008-01-28.
 "The 'Inconvenient Truth' of statistical design", SCDsource, 2007-12-05.
 "Where's the value in DFM? D or M?", Chip Design, 2007-03-01.
 "Altos closes $1.5M, signs Jim Hogan", EE Times, 2007-01-05.
 "Firms partner on standard statistical analysis library format", EE Times, 2006-07-25.
 "What's Hot at DAC?", EE Times, 2006-07-17.
 "Startup to 'Liberate' library characterization", EE Times, 2006-07-03.

External links
 http://www.altos-da.com

Electronic design automation companies
Companies based in San Jose, California